State Route 201 (SR 201) is a 23.0 mile long north-south state highway in West Tennessee.

Route description

SR 201 begins in Chester County at an intersection with SR 22. It heads southeast through wooded areas to cross into Henderson County and pass through farmland for several miles to enter Sardis, where it has an intersection with SR 421 and has a short concurrency with SR 104. The highway then leaves Sardis and winds its way northeast through a mix of farmland and wooded areas to enter Scotts Hill and come to an intersection with SR 114 in downtown. SR 201 now turns northwest, concurrent with SR 114, to pass through a business district and have an intersection with SR 100. SR 114/SR 201 then leave Scotts Hill and wind their way north through a mix of farmland and wooded areas for several miles before SR 201 splits off goes east. Throughout the entire concurrency with SR 114, SR 201 is unsigned. SR 201 continues east through rural areas before crossing into Decatur County and coming to an end shortly thereafter at an intersection with SR 202, just northwest of Decaturville. The entire route of SR 201 is a two-lane highway.

Major intersections

References

201
Transportation in Chester County, Tennessee
Transportation in Henderson County, Tennessee
Transportation in Decatur County, Tennessee